Marie-Pier Pinault-Reid (born December 20, 1988) is a Canadian rugby player. She represented Canada at the 2014 Women's Rugby World Cup and was voted to the tournament Dream Team.

International career 
Pinault-Reid joined the national team in 2011 at the Nations Cups and retired from the national team in 2016.

University rugby 
During her first three years at the University of Laval in 2009-2012, she was named a RSEQ all-star, and returned in 2014 to study medicine.

French rugby clubs 
Before the 2014 world cup, she played in France with the Lons RC in 2012-2013 and AS Bayonne in 2013-2014.

References

1988 births
Living people
Canadian female rugby union players
Canada women's international rugby union players
Female rugby union players
Laval Rouge et Or athletes